Troy is a 2004 American epic historical war film directed by Wolfgang Petersen and written by David Benioff. Produced by units in Malta, Mexico and Britain's Shepperton Studios, the film features an ensemble cast led by Brad Pitt, Eric Bana, Sean Bean and Orlando Bloom. It is loosely based on Homer's Iliad in its narration of the entire story of the decade-long Trojan War—condensed into little more than a couple of weeks, rather than just the quarrel between Achilles and Agamemnon in the ninth year. Achilles leads his Myrmidons along with the rest of the Greek army invading the historical city of Troy, defended by Hector's Trojan army. The end of the film (the sack of Troy) is not taken from the Iliad, but rather from Quintus Smyrnaeus's Posthomerica as the Iliad concludes with Hector's death and funeral.

Troy made over $497 million worldwide, making it the 60th highest-grossing film at the time of its release. However, it received mixed reviews, with critics praising its entertainment value and Pitt's performance, but criticizing its story and unfaithfulness to the Iliad itself. It received a nomination for Best Costume Design at the 77th Academy Awards and was the eighth highest-grossing film of 2004.

Plot

In Ancient Greece, King Agamemnon of Mycenae finally unites the Greek kingdoms after decades of warfare, forming a loose alliance under his rule. Achilles, a Greek warrior who has given Agamemnon many victories, deeply despises him for treating him like a mere mercenary. Meanwhile, Prince Hector of Troy and his younger brother Paris negotiate a peace treaty with Menelaus, King of Sparta. However, Paris starts an affair with Menelaus' wife, Queen Helen, and smuggles her aboard their home-bound vessel. Upon learning of this, Menelaus meets with Agamemnon, his older brother, and asks him to help take Troy. Agamemnon agrees, as conquering Troy will give him control of the Aegean Sea. Agamemnon has Odysseus, King of Ithaca, persuade Achilles to join them. Achilles eventually decides to go after his mother Thetis tells him that, though he will die, he will be forever glorified.

In Troy, King Priam welcomes Helen when Hector and Paris return home, and decides to prepare for war. The Greeks eventually invade and take the Trojan beach, thanks largely to Achilles and his Myrmidons. Achilles has the temple of Apollo sacked, and claims Briseis — a priestess and the cousin of Paris and Hector — as a prisoner. In the aftermath, Agamemnon spitefully takes Briseis from Achilles, goading him to not support the Greeks in the siege.

On the following day, the Trojan and Greek armies meet outside the walls of Troy. During a parley, Paris offers to duel Menelaus for Helen's hand in exchange for the city being spared. Agamemnon, intending to take the city regardless of the outcome, accepts. Menelaus wounds Paris and almost kills him, but is himself killed by Hector who breaks the rules of the duel to save his brother. An enraged Agamemnon orders the Greeks to crush the Trojan army. In the ensuing brutal battle, Hector engages and kills Ajax in a fierce duel while many Greek soldiers fall to the Trojan defenses, forcing Agamemnon to retreat. Later that night, Agamemnon is convinced by Odyssesus to reconcile with Achilles as they need him in battle and the only way to do so would be to give Briseis back to him but Agamemnon reveals he has given Briseis to his soldiers for their amusement. Achilles saves Briseis and later, she sneaks into his quarters to kill him but instead, she falls for him and they become lovers. Achilles then resolves to leave Troy, much to the dismay of Patroclus, his cousin and protégé.

Meanwhile, despite Hector's objections, Priam orders him to retake the Trojan beach and force the Greeks to leave, but the attack unifies the Greeks, and the Myrmidons enter the battle. Hector duels a man he believes to be Achilles and kills him, only to discover it was actually Patroclus. Distraught, both armies agree to stop fighting for the day. Achilles is informed of his cousin's death and vows revenge. Wary of Achilles, Hector shows his wife Andromache a secret tunnel beneath Troy; should he die and the city fall, he instructs her to take their child and any survivors out of the city to Mount Ida.

The next day, Achilles arrives outside Troy and challenges Hector; the two engage in a fierce duel until Hector is killed. Achilles desecrates Hector's corpse by tying him up to his chariot, dragging him all the way back to the Trojan beach. Night falls and Priam sneaks into the Greek camp, imploring Achilles to return Hector's body for a proper funeral. Ashamed of his actions, Achilles agrees and allows Briseis to return to Troy with Priam, promising a twelve-day truce so that Hector's funeral rites may be held in peace. He also orders his men to return home without him.

Sometime after, Agamemnon declares that he will take Troy regardless of the cost. Concerned over prolonging the siege which will cause more casualties and incite mutiny within the army, Odysseus concocts a plan to infiltrate the city and end the war quickly: he has the Greeks build a gigantic wooden horse as a peace offering and feign a retreat so the Trojans can take the bait. The plan works as Priam orders the horse be brought into the city. That night, Greek soldiers hiding inside the horse emerge and open the city gates for the Greek army, commencing the brutal Sack of Troy. While Andromache and Helen guide the Trojans to safety through the tunnel, Paris gives the Sword of Troy to Aeneas, instructing him to protect the Trojans and find them a new home. Agamemnon kills Priam and captures Briseis, who then kills Agamemnon. Achilles fights his way through the city and reunites with Briseis. Paris, seeking to avenge his brother, shoots an arrow through Achilles' heel and then several into his body. Achilles bids farewell to Briseis, and watches her flee with Paris before dying.

In the aftermath, Troy is finally taken by the Greeks and a funeral is held for Achilles, during which Odysseus personally cremates his body.

Cast

Production
The city of Troy was built in the Mediterranean island of Malta at Fort Ricasoli from April to June 2003. Other important scenes were shot in Mellieħa, a small town in the north of Malta, and on the small island of Comino. The outer walls of Troy were built and filmed in Cabo San Lucas, Mexico. Film production was disrupted for a period after Hurricane Marty affected filming areas. The role of Briseis was initially offered to Bollywood actress Aishwarya Rai, but she turned it down because she was not comfortable doing the lovemaking scenes that were included. The role eventually went to Rose Byrne.

Music

Composer Gabriel Yared originally worked on the score for Troy for over a year, having been hired by the director, Wolfgang Petersen. Tanja Carovska provided vocals on various portions of the music, as she later would on composer James Horner's version of the soundtrack. However, the reactions at test screenings which used an incomplete version of the score were negative, and in less than a day Yared was off the project without a chance to fix or change his music. James Horner composed a replacement score in about four weeks. He used Carovska's vocals again and also included traditional Eastern Mediterranean music and brass instruments. Horner also collaborated with American singer-songwriter Josh Groban and lyricist Cynthia Weil to write an original song for the film's end credits. The product of this collaboration, "Remember Me", was performed by Groban with additional vocals by Carovska.

The soundtrack for the film was released on May 11, 2004, through Reprise Records.

Director's cut

Troy: Director's Cut was screened at the 57th Berlin International Film Festival on February 17, 2007, and received a limited release in Germany in April 2007. Warner Home Video reportedly spent more than $1 million for the director's cut, which includes "at least 1,000 new cuts" or almost 30 minutes extra footage (with a new running time of 196 minutes). The DVD was released on September 18, 2007, in the US. The score of the film was changed dramatically, with many of the female vocals being cut. An addition to the music is the use of Danny Elfman's theme for Planet of the Apes during the pivotal fight between Hector and Achilles in front of the Gates of Troy. Josh Groban's song was removed from the end credits as well.

Various shots were recut and extended. For instance, the love scene between Helen and Paris was reframed to include more nudity of Diane Kruger. The love scene between Achilles and Briseis is also extended. Only one scene was removed: the scene where Helen tends to the wound of Paris is taken out. The battle scenes were also extended, depicting more violence and gore, including much more of Ajax's bloody rampage on the Trojans during the initial attack by the Greek Army. Perhaps most significant was the sacking of Troy, barely present in the theatrical cut, but shown fully here, depicting the soldiers raping women and murdering babies. Characters were provided more time to develop, specifically Priam and Odysseus, the latter being given a humorous introduction scene. More emphasis is given to the internal conflict in Troy between the priests, who believe in omens and signs from the gods to determine the outcome of the war, and military commanders, who believe in practical battle strategies to achieve victory. Lastly, bookend scenes were added: the beginning being a soldier's dog finding its dead master and the end including a sequence where the few surviving Trojans escape to Mount Ida.

There are frequent differences between the Iliad and Troy, most notably relating to the final fates of Paris, Helen, Agamemnon, Achilles, and Menelaus. In one of the commentary sequences, the film's writer, David Benioff, said that when it came to deciding whether to follow the Iliad or to do what was best for the film, they always decided what was best for the film.

Home media 
Troy was released on DVD and VHS on January 4, 2005. The director's cut was released on Blu-ray and DVD on September 18, 2007. The directors cut is the only edition of the film available on Blu-ray, however the theatrical cut was released on HD-DVD.

Reception

Box office 
Troy grossed $133.4 million in the United States and Canada, and $364 million in other territories, for a worldwide total of $497.4 million, making the film one of the highest grossing films of 2004, alongside The Passion of the Christ, Spider-Man 2 and Shrek 2. When the film was completed, total production costs were approximately $185 million, making Troy one of the most expensive films produced at that time. It was screened out of competition at the 2004 Cannes Film Festival.

The film made $46.9 million in its opening weekend, topping the box office, then $23.9 million in its second weekend falling to second.

Critical reception
On Rotten Tomatoes, Troy holds an approval rating of 54% based on 229 reviews, with an average rating of 6.00/10. The site's critics consensus reads, "A brawny, entertaining spectacle, but lacking emotional resonance." On Metacritic, the film has a weighted average score of 56 out of 100, based on 43 critics, indicating "mixed or average reviews". Audiences polled by CinemaScore gave the film an average grade of "B" on an A+ to F scale.

Roger Ebert rated the film two out of four stars, saying "Pitt is modern, nuanced, introspective; he brings complexity to a role where it is not required." IGN critics Christopher Monfette and Cindy White praised the director's cut as superior to the early version, evaluating it with eight stars out of ten.

Peter O'Toole, who played Priam, spoke negatively of the film during an appearance at the Savannah Film Festival, stating he walked out of the film fifteen minutes into a screening, and criticized the director, slamming him as "a clown". Years later, Brad Pitt expressed disappointment with the film saying, "I had to do Troy because [...] I pulled out of another movie and then had to do something for the studio. So I was put in Troy. It wasn't painful, but I realized that the way that movie was being told was not how I wanted it to be. I made my own mistakes in it. What am I trying to say about Troy? I could not get out of the middle of the frame. It was driving me crazy. I'd become spoiled working with David Fincher. It's no slight on Wolfgang Petersen. Das Boot is one of the all-time great films. But somewhere in it, Troy became a commercial kind of thing. Every shot was like, 'Here's the hero!' There was no mystery."

Accolades

See also
 Sword-and-sandal
 Epic film
 Greek mythology in popular culture
 List of films based on poems
 List of historical period drama films

References

Further reading
 Petersen, Daniel (2006). Troja: Embedded im Troianischen Krieg (Troy: Embedded in the Trojan War). HörGut! Verlag. .
 Winkler, Martin M. (2006). Troy: From Homer's Iliad to Hollywood Epic. Blackwell Publishing. .
 Proch, Celina/Kleu, Michael (2013). Models of Maculinities in Troy: Achilles, Hector and Their Female Partners, in: A.-B. Renger/J. Solomon (ed.): Ancient Worlds in Film and Television. Gender and Politics, Brill, pp. 175–193, .

External links

 
 
 
 
 
 
 

2004 films
2000s adventure films
2004 romantic drama films
2000s war films
American action drama films
American romantic drama films
American epic films
Mexican war drama films
American war drama films
British epic films
British war drama films
Classical war films
2000s English-language films
Films about brothers
Films about death
American films about revenge
Films based on multiple works
Films based on poems
Films based on the Iliad
Films directed by Wolfgang Petersen
Films scored by James Horner
Films set in ancient Greece
Films set in Greece
Films set in Turkey
Films shot in Mexico
Films shot in Malta
Films shot in Morocco
Maltese drama films
Plan B Entertainment films
Romantic epic films
Siege films
Trojan War films
Troy
War adventure films
War epic films
Warner Bros. films
Works based on the Aeneid
Films based on classical mythology
Cultural depictions of Helen of Troy
2000s action drama films
Films with screenplays by David Benioff
Agamemnon
2000s American films
2000s British films
2000s Mexican films